The Devonshire-class cruiser was a group of six armoured cruisers built for the Royal Navy in the first decade of the 20th century. All ships of the class served in World War I. Argyll was wrecked, and Hampshire was sunk by a naval mine. The four survivors were disposed of soon after the war.

Design and description
The Devonshire class was designed as improved versions of the preceding Monmouth class and were also intended for commerce protection.
The armament of the new design was made more powerful by the replacement of the twin six-inch (152 mm) turrets and the forward double six-inch casemates by four 7.5-inch (190 mm) single turrets in a diamond arrangement. The ships were designed to displace . The engines were powered by seventeen Yarrow and six cylindrical boilers.

The main armament of the Devonshire class consisted of four breech-loading (BL) 7.5-inch Mk I guns mounted in four single-gun turrets, one each fore and aft of the superstructure and one on each side. Their secondary armament of six BL 6-inch Mk VII guns was arranged in casemates amidships. Four of these were mounted on the main deck and were only usable in calm weather. The ships also carried 18 quick-firing (QF) 3-pounder Hotchkiss guns and two submerged 18-inch (450 mm) torpedo tubes. Her two 12-pounder 8-cwt guns could be dismounted for service ashore.

At some point in the war, the main deck six-inch guns of the Devonshire-class ships were moved to the upper deck and given gun shields. Their casemates were plated over to improve seakeeping and the four 3-pounder guns displaced by the transfer were landed.

The armour of the gun turrets was also five inches thick whilst that of their barbettes was six inches thick.

Ships
Antrim, launched on 8 October 1903, sold for breaking up on 19 December 1922.
Argyll, launched on 3 March 1904, wrecked on 28 October 1915.
Carnarvon, launched on 7 October 1903, sold for breaking up on 8 November 1921.
Devonshire, launched on 30 April 1904, sold for breaking up on 9 May 1921.
Hampshire, launched on 4 September 1903, sunk by a naval mine on 5 June 1916.
Roxburgh, launched on 19 January 1904, sold on 8 November 1921.

Building Programme

The following table gives the build details and purchase cost of the members of the Devonshire class.  Standard British practice at that time was for these costs to exclude armament and stores.  The 1905 edition costs were compiled before the ships were complete.

*** = cost published by Brassey before the ship was complete, i.e. the total cost may have been more than this.

Notes

Footnotes

Bibliography 
 Brassey, T.A. (ed)The Naval Annual 1905
 
 

 
 Leyland, J. and Brassey, T.A. (ed) Brassey's Naval Annual|The Naval Annual 1906

External links

The Dreadnought Project Technical details of the ships.

Cruiser classes
 
Ship classes of the Royal Navy